The Provo Utah Temple (formerly the Provo Temple) is the seventeenth constructed and fifteenth operating temple of the Church of Jesus Christ of Latter-day Saints (LDS Church). Located in the city of Provo, Utah, it was built with a modern single-spire design, similar to the original design of the Ogden Utah Temple.

History
Since Provo's early years, a hill just northeast of downtown Provo was known as "Temple Hill". Instead of a temple, however, the Maeser Building was built on the hill in 1911 as a part of the Brigham Young University (BYU) campus. A  block of property at the base of Rock Canyon was chosen as the site for the Provo Temple.

The LDS Church announced the intention to construct a temple in Provo on August 14, 1967. A groundbreaking ceremony, to signify the beginning of construction, was held on September 15, 1969. The temple was dedicated on February 9, 1972, by church president Joseph Fielding Smith. The two dedicatory services were broadcast to several large auditoriums on the BYU campus, including the 22,700-seat Marriott Center. Thirty-one years after the temple's completion, a statue of the Angel Moroni was added to the spire, which itself was changed from gold to white.

Emil B. Fetzer, the architect for the Ogden and Provo temples, was asked to create a functional design with efficiency, convenience, and reasonable cost as key factors. The design of the temple was inspired by a scripture in Exodus 13:21 which describes the Lord going before the children of Israel by day as a cloud and by night as a pillar of fire. The panels on the sides of the temple feature a gothic arch motif, commonly used in religious architecture. The temple has 6 ordinance rooms and 12 sealing rooms, all surrounded by a circular hallway, and has a total floor area of 128,325 square feet (11,921.8 m2).

In the spring of 1983, major flooding in the region threatened the temple. On May 29, 1983, the city, with help from volunteers, turned Temple View Drive into a temporary river.

In large part because of its location across the street from a Missionary Training Center and proximity to the BYU campus, the Provo Utah Temple is one of the church's busiest. In 2016, the Provo City Center Temple was dedicated, making Provo the second city in the world, following South Jordan, Utah, to have two active temples. The two temples are 2.4 miles apart. A temple to temple run is held annually between the two temples.

In 2020, like all the church's temples, the Provo Utah Temple was closed for a time in response to the coronavirus pandemic. It was reopened May 11, 2020 for limited use, and then completely reopened June 14, 2021.

As of 2022, the temple serves stakes from the cities of Provo, Orem, Vineyard, Midway and Heber City.

In the October 2021 general conference, church president Russell M. Nelson announced the temple would be reconstructed following the dedication of the Orem Utah Temple, which is expected to be completed in fall 2023. The new design will not reflect the modernist plans of the original building, despite some opposition from community members. The new designs are similar to other contemporary temples including the Orem Utah Temple and the Deseret Peak Utah Temple.

Temple presidents
Notable temple presidents have included: A. Theodore Tuttle (1980–82); J. Elliot Cameron (1989–92); Dean L. Larsen (1998–2001); Merrill J. Bateman (2007–10); Robert H. Daines III (2010–13); and Alan Ashton (2013–2016).

See also

 The Church of Jesus Christ of Latter-day Saints in Utah
 Comparison of temples of The Church of Jesus Christ of Latter-day Saints
 List of temples of The Church of Jesus Christ of Latter-day Saints
 List of temples of The Church of Jesus Christ of Latter-day Saints by geographic region
 Temple architecture (Latter-day Saints)

References

External links

 Provo Utah Temple Official site
 Provo Utah Temple at ChurchofJesusChristTemples.org

20th-century Latter Day Saint temples
Buildings and structures in Provo, Utah
Religious buildings and structures completed in 1972
Temples (LDS Church) in Utah
1972 establishments in Utah
Religious buildings and structures in Utah County, Utah
Tourist attractions in Provo, Utah